Erich Wolfgang Korngold composed his Violin Concerto in D major, Op. 35, in 1945.

Instrumentation
The work is scored for solo violin, two flutes (one doubling piccolo), two oboes (one doubling cor anglais), two clarinets, bass clarinet, two bassoons (one doubling contrabassoon), four horns, two trumpets, trombone, harp, strings, and a colorful percussion section of timpani, bass drum, cymbals, gong, tubular bell, glockenspiel, vibraphone, xylophone, and celesta.

Movements
Moderato nobile: The violin solo which opens the concerto is a theme from Another Dawn (1937), running over two octaves in five notes.  Juarez (1939) provided the second theme (the Maximilian & Carlotta theme), more expansive and reliant upon the orchestra. 
Romance: The solo violin introduces the principal theme of the slow movement, quoted from Anthony Adverse (1936) and revisited after a contrasting middle section that seems to have been uniquely composed for the concerto.
Allegro assai vivace: The most demanding movement for the soloist begins with a staccato jig, which leads to a second theme based like the first on the main motif from The Prince and the Pauper (1937) and builds up to a virtuoso climax.
A typical performance lasts about 25 minutes.

Overview

Korngold had vowed to give up composing anything other than film music, with which he supported himself and his family, until Hitler had been defeated. With the end of World War II, he retired from films to concentrate on music for the concert hall. The Violin Concerto was the first such work that Korngold penned, following some initial persuasion from the violinist and fellow émigré Bronisław Huberman. Korngold had been hurt by the assumption that a successful film composer was one who had sold his integrity to Hollywood, just as earlier he had been hurt by many critics' assumptions that his works were performed only because he was the son of music critic Julius Korngold. He was thus determined to prove himself with a work that combined vitality and superb craftsmanship.

The concerto was dedicated to Alma Mahler, the widow of Korngold's childhood mentor Gustav Mahler.  It was premiered on 15 February 1947 by Jascha Heifetz and the St. Louis Symphony under conductor Vladimir Golschmann.  It received the most enthusiastic ovation in St. Louis concert history.  On 30 March 1947, Heifetz played the concerto in Carnegie Hall with the New York Philharmonic conducted by Efrem Kurtz; the broadcast performance was recorded on transcription discs.  The composer wrote about Heifetz's playing of the work:

In spite of the demand for virtuosity in the finale, the work with its many melodic and lyric episodes was contemplated more for a Caruso than for a Paganini. It is needless to say how delighted I am to have my concerto performed by Caruso and Paganini in one person: Jascha Heifetz. 

Heifetz's performance launched the work into the standard repertoire, and it quickly became Korngold's most popular piece.  However, the fame of the violin concerto, combined with Korngold's eminent association with Hollywood film music, has helped obscure the rest of his legacy as a composer of concert-hall works written before and after his arrival in the United States.

Although Korngold was credited with introducing the sophisticated musical language of his classical training to the soundscapes of Hollywood films, a kind of reverse inspiration also occurred.  Like many of Korngold's "serious" works in traditional genres, the violin concerto borrows thematic material from his movie scores in each of its three movements.

Notable recordings
Nigel Armstrong and Neville Marriner with the Colburn Orchestra
Kristóf Baráti and Otto Tausk with the South Netherlands Philharmonic
Nicola Benedetti and Kirill Karabits with the Bournemouth Symphony Orchestra
Renaud Capuçon and Yannick Nézet-Séguin with the Rotterdam Philharmonic Orchestra
Miranda Cuckson and Paul Freeman with the Czech National Symphony Orchestra
Glenn Dicterow and David Robertson with the New York Philharmonic
James Ehnes and Bramwell Tovey with the Vancouver Symphony Orchestra
Liza Ferschtman and Jiří Malát with the Prague Symphony Orchestra
Vilde Frang and James Gaffigan with the Frankfurt Radio Symphony
Alexander A. Gilman and Perry So with the Cape Town Philharmonic Orchestra
Vadim Gluzman and Neeme Järvi with the Residentie Orchestra
Caroline Goulding and Kevin John Edusei with the Bern Symphony Orchestra
Ilya Gringolts and Julien Salemkour with the Copenhagen Philharmonic
Andrew Haveron and Jiří Bělohlávek with the BBC Symphony Orchestra
Andrew Haveron and John Wilson with the RTÉ Concert Orchestra
Jascha Heifetz and Alfred Wallenstein with the Los Angeles Philharmonic Orchestra. This recording was inducted into the Grammy Hall of Fame. 
Ulf Hoelscher and Willy Mattes with the Stuttgart Radio Symphony Orchestra
Daniel Hope and Alexander Shelley with the Royal Stockholm Philharmonic Orchestra
Thomas Albertus Irnberger and Doron Salomon with the Israel Philharmonic Orchestra
Chantal Juillet and John Mauceri with the Berlin Radio Symphony Orchestra
Laurent Korcia and Jean-Jacques Kantorow with the Orchestre Philharmonique de Liège
Ji-yoon Lee and Kristiina Poska with the Odense Symphony Orchestra
Jack Liebeck and Paul Watkins with the Ulster Orchestra
Ulrike-Anima Mathé and Andrew Litton with the Dallas Symphony Orchestra
Anne-Sophie Mutter and André Previn with the London Symphony Orchestra
František Novotný and Martin Turnovský with the Brno Philharmonic
Hyehoon Park and Lawrence Renes with the Bavarian Radio Symphony Orchestra
Itzhak Perlman and André Previn with the Pittsburgh Symphony Orchestra
Philippe Quint and Carlos Miguel Prieto with the Orquesta Sinfonica de Mineria
Benjamin Schmid and Seiji Ozawa with the Wiener Philharmoniker
Gil Shaham and André Previn with the London Symphony Orchestra
Baiba Skride and Santtu-Matias Rouvali with the Gothenburg Symphony Orchestra
Arabella Steinbacher and Lawrence Foster with the Gulbenkian Orchestra
Matthew Trusler and Yasuo Shinozaki with the Dusseldorfer Symphoniker
Paul Waltman and David Björkman with the Swedish Radio Symphony Orchestra
Vera Tsu and Yu Long with the Razumovsky Sinfonia
Nikolaj Znaider and Valery Gergiev with the Vienna Philharmonic Orchestra

References
Notes

Bibliography

External links

Sound Files (MP3) of The Japanese Premiere of Korngold:Violin Concerto (1989)
American Symphony Orchestra program notes, September 20, 1992
National Symphony Orchestra program notes, February 3-5, 2005
Korngold: Violin Concerto; Schauspiel Overture; Much Adio About Nothing - Philippe Quint | Songs, Reviews, Credits
Violinist.com interview with Philippe Quint: for the Love of Korngold

Korngold
Compositions by Erich Wolfgang Korngold
1945 compositions
Compositions in D major